Pseudomonas otitidis is a Gram-negative bacterium that causes otitis. The type strain is ATCC BAA-1130.

References

External links
Type strain of Pseudomonas otitidis at BacDive -  the Bacterial Diversity Metadatabase

Pseudomonadales
Bacteria described in 2006